Ahmed Temsah (born 12 April 1986) is an Egyptian footballer who plays for El Dakhleya, as well as the Egypt national football team.

References

1986 births
Living people
Egyptian footballers
Smouha SC players
Egyptian Premier League players
Association football midfielders
Association football forwards